Uniminipet is a South Korean aeni produced by Dong Woo Animation in South Korea.

Overview
Uniminipet (유니미니펫) is about the adventures of the ordinary boy Dong Woo with Uniland agents Miaow (Goyang) and Ham (Haem). Uniminipet was broadcast in Turkey during 2010 with the name "Taşın Sırrı". Uniminipet surpassed the anime shows such as Pokémon and Digimon with a 10.1% rating on its first run. It continued to receive good ratings throughout the early 2000s. Uniminipet products are being sold in Japan and China.

Episodes
 Born! UNIPET.
 Get Willitel.
  Mercy Mash.
 Magician Magic Catch 
  Pori!
  Fifi in the bag Seven! 
 Lucky ball!
  Face the Victory King
  Dong Woo's crisis.
  Exploring the Cliffs
  Go for the Cup!
  New Red Rose Society
  Theft of Famous Painting
  Grab the earbats.
  back the strange egg.
  The appearance of sea monsters
  happened at the campsite.
  Keep to the plan.
  The Last of the Black Rose a counter-attack of 
  prog
  Mysterious Meteorite
  Fake Ham Appears
  The Horror of Ghost House of Ghosts
  Rebellion of the Horn 
  Crystal Found
  Farewells and promises.

See also
 Aeni

References

2001 South Korean television series debuts
2001 South Korean television series endings
South Korean children's animated adventure television series
South Korean children's animated comedy television series
South Korean children's animated fantasy television series
Animated television series about robots